Przemęt  is a village in Wolsztyn County, Greater Poland Voivodeship, in west-central Poland. It is the seat of the gmina (administrative district) called Gmina Przemęt. It also gives its name to the surrounding protected area called Przemęt Landscape Park.

The village has a population of 1,600.

References

Villages in Wolsztyn County